Dracaena is a genus of about 120 species of trees and succulent shrubs.  The formerly accepted genera Pleomele and  Sansevieria are now included in Dracaena. In the APG IV classification system, it is placed in the family Asparagaceae, subfamily Nolinoideae (formerly the family Ruscaceae). It has also formerly been separated (sometimes with Cordyline) into the family Dracaenaceae or placed in the Agavaceae (now Agavoideae).

The name dracaena is derived from the romanized form of the Ancient Greek  – drakaina, "female dragon".

The majority of the species are native to Africa, southern Asia through to northern Australia, with two species in tropical Central America.

Description
Species of Dracaena have a secondary thickening meristem in their trunk, termed Dracaenoid thickening by some authors, which is quite different from the thickening meristem found in dicotyledonous plants. This characteristic is shared with members of the Agavoideae and Xanthorrhoeoideae among other members of the Asparagales.

Dracaena species can be classified in two growth types: treelike dracaenas (Dracaena fragrans, Dracaena draco, Dracaena cinnabari), which have aboveground stems that branch from nodes after flowering, or if the growth tip is severed, and rhizomatous dracaenas (Dracaena trifasciata, Dracaena angolensis), which have underground rhizomes and leaves on the surface (ranging from straplike to cylindrical).

Many species of Dracaena are kept as houseplants due to tolerance of lower light and sparse watering.

Species
Plants of the World Online currently includes:

 Dracaena acaulis Baker
 Dracaena acutissima Hua
 Dracaena adamii Hepper
 Dracaena aethiopica (Thunb.) Byng & Christenh.
 Dracaena afromontana Mildbr.
 Dracaena aletriformis (Haw.) Bos (syn. D. latifolia)
 Dracaena americana Donn.Sm. – Central America dragon tree
 Dracaena angolensis (Welw. ex Carrière) Byng & Christenh.
 Dracaena angustifolia (Medik.) Roxb. (syn. D. australasica, D. ensiformis, D. fruticosa, D. linearifolia, D. menglaensis)
 Dracaena arborea (Willd.) Link
 Dracaena arborescens (Cornu ex Gérôme & Labroy) Byng & Christenh.
 Dracaena ascendens (L.E.Newton) Byng & Christenh.
 Dracaena aubryana Brongn. ex É.Morren (syn. D. thalioides)
 Dracaena aubrytiana (Carrière) Byng & Christenh.
 Dracaena aurea H.Mann
 Dracaena bacularis (Pfennig ex A.Butler & Jankalski) Byng & Christenh.
 Dracaena bagamoyensis (N.E.Br.) Byng & Christenh.
 Dracaena ballyi (L.E.Newton) Byng & Christenh.
 Dracaena bhitalae (Webb & Newton) Takaw.-Ny. & Mucina
 Dracaena bicolor Hook.
 Dracaena borneensis (Merr.) Jankalski
 Dracaena brachyphylla Kurz
 Dracaena braunii Engl. (syn. D. litoralis)
 Dracaena breviflora Ridl.
 Dracaena bueana Engl.
 Dracaena bugandana Byng & Christenh.
 Dracaena bukedea Takaw.-Ny. & Mucina
 Dracaena burdettii (Chahin.) Byng & Christenh.
 Dracaena burmanica (N.E.Br.) Byng & Christenh.
 Dracaena bushii Damen
 Dracaena calocephala Bos
 Dracaena cambodiana Pierre ex Gagnep.
 Dracaena camerooniana Baker
 Dracaena canaliculata (Carrière) Byng & Christenh.
 Dracaena cantleyi Baker
 Dracaena caulescens (N.E.Br.) Byng & Christenh.
 Dracaena cerasifera Hua
 Dracaena chahinianii (Webb & Myklebust) Takaw.-Ny. & Mucina
 Dracaena chiniana I.M.Turner
 Dracaena cincta Baker
 Dracaena cinnabari Balf.f. – Socotra dragon tree
 Dracaena cochinchinensis (Lour.) S.C.Chen (syn. D. loureiroi)
 Dracaena concinna Kunth
 Dracaena conferta Ridl.
 Dracaena congoensis Hua
 Dracaena conspicua (N.E.Br.) Byng & Christenh.
 Dracaena cristula W.Bull
 Dracaena cubensis Vict.
 Dracaena curtisii Ridl.
 Dracaena cuspidata Ridl.
 Dracaena dawei (Stapf) Byng & Christenh.
 Dracaena deremensis (L.) Ker Gawl. (syn. D. fragrans) – striped dracaena, compact dracaena, corn plant, cornstalk dracaena
 Dracaena dhofarica (T.A.McCoy & Lavranos) Takaw.-Ny. & Mucina
 Dracaena dooneri (N.E.Br.) Byng & Christenh.
 Dracaena downsii (Chahin.) Byng & Christenh.
 Dracaena draco (L.) L. – Canary Islands dragon tree
 Dracaena dumetescens (L.E.Newton) Byng & Christenh.
 Dracaena ebracteata (Cav.) Byng & Christenh.
 Dracaena eilensis (Chahin.) Byng & Christenh.
 Dracaena ellenbeckiana Engl. - Kedong Dracaena (Ethiopia, Kenya, Uganda)
 Dracaena elliptica Thunb. & Dalm. (syn. D. gracilis, D. javanica, D. maculata)
 Dracaena erythraeae (Mattei) Byng & Christenh.
 Dracaena fasciata (Cornu ex Gérôme & Labroy) Byng & Christenh.
 Dracaena fernaldii (H.St.John) Jankalski
 Dracaena finlaysonii Baker
 Dracaena floribunda Baker
 Dracaena fontanesiana Schult. & Schult.f.
 Dracaena forbesii (O.Deg.) Jankalski
 Dracaena forskaliana (Schult. & Schult.f.) Byng & Christenh.
 Dracaena fragrans (L.) Ker Gawl. (syn. D. deremensis) – striped dracaena, compact dracaena, corn plant, cornstalk dracaena
 Dracaena francisii (Chahin.) Byng & Christenh.
 Dracaena frequens (Chahin.) Byng & Christenh.
 Dracaena glomerata Baker
 Dracaena goldieana Bullen ex Mast. & T.Moore
 Dracaena gracillima (Chahin.) Byng & Christenh.
 Dracaena granulata Hook.f.
 Dracaena griffithii Regel
 Dracaena haemanthoides Bos ex Damen
 Dracaena halapepe (H.St.John) Jankalski
 Dracaena halemanuensis Jankalski
 Dracaena hallii (Chahin.) Byng & Christenh.
 Dracaena hanningtonii Baker (syn. D. oldupai)
 Dracaena hargeisana (Chahin.) Byng & Christenh.
 Dracaena hewittii Ridl.
 Dracaena hokouensis G.Z.Ye
 Dracaena hosei (Ridl.) Jankalski
 Dracaena humiflora (D.J.Richards) Byng & Christenh.
 Dracaena hyacinthoides (L.) Mabb.
 Dracaena impressivenia Yu H.Yan & H.J.Guo
 Dracaena itumei (Mbugua) Byng & Christenh.
 Dracaena jayniana Wilkin & Suksathan
 Dracaena kaweesakii Wilkin & Suksathan
 Dracaena kirkii Baker
 Dracaena konaensis (H.St.John) Jankalski
 Dracaena kupensis Mwachala, Cheek, Eb.Fisch. & Muasya
 Dracaena laevifolia (R.H.Webb & L.E.Newton) Takaw.-Ny. & Mucina
 Dracaena lancea Thunb. & Dalm.
 Dracaena lancifolia (Ridl.) Jankalski
 Dracaena lavranii (Webb & Myklebust) Takaw.-Ny. & Mucina
 Dracaena laxissima Engl.
 Dracaena liberica (Gérôme & Labroy) Byng & Christenh.
 Dracaena longiflora (Sims) Byng & Christenh.
 Dracaena longifolia Ridl.
 Dracaena longistyla (la Croix) Byng & Christenh.
 Dracaena lunatifolia (L.E.Newton) Byng & Christenh.
 Dracaena maingayi Hook.f.
 Dracaena malawiana Byng & Christenh.
 Dracaena mannii Baker
 Dracaena marina Bos ex Damen
 Dracaena masoniana (Chahin.) Byng & Christenh.
 Dracaena mokoko Mwachala & Cheek
 Dracaena multiflora Warb. ex P.Sarasin & Sarasin
 Dracaena newtoniana (T.G.Forrest) Byng & Christenh.
 Dracaena nilotica (Baker) Byng & Christenh.
 Dracaena nitens Welw. ex Baker
 Dracaena nitida (Chahin.) Byng & Christenh.
 Dracaena novoguineensis Gibbs
 Dracaena nyangensis Pellegr.
 Dracaena ombet Heuglin ex Kotschy & Peyr. – Gabal Elba dragon tree
 Dracaena ovata Ker Gawl.
 Dracaena pachyphylla Kurz
 Dracaena parva (N.E.Br.) Byng & Christenh.
 Dracaena parviflora Baker
 Dracaena patens (N.E.Br.) Byng & Christenh.
 Dracaena pearsonii (N.E.Br.) Byng & Christenh.
 Dracaena pedicellata (la Croix) Byng & Christenh.
 Dracaena penangensis Ridl.
 Dracaena pendula Ridl.
 Dracaena perrotii (O.Warburg) Byng & Christenh.
 Dracaena perrottetii Baker
 Dracaena pethera Byng & Christenh.
 Dracaena petiolata Hook.f.
 Dracaena pfisteri (D.J.Richards) Byng & Christenh.
 Dracaena phanerophlebia Baker
 Dracaena phillipsiae (N.E.Br.) Byng & Christenh.
 Dracaena phrynioides Hook.
 Dracaena pinguicula (P.R.O.Bally) Byng & Christenh.
 Dracaena porteri Baker
 Dracaena powellii (N.E.Br.) Byng & Christenh.
 Dracaena powysii (L.E.Newton) Byng & Christenh.
 Dracaena praetermissa Bos
 Dracaena purpurea (Ridl.) Jankalski
 Dracaena raffillii (N.E.Br.) Byng & Christenh.
 Dracaena reflexa Lam. – Pleomele dracaena or "Song of India"
 D. reflexa var. marginata (syn. D. marginata) – red-edged dracaena or Madagascar dragon tree
 Dracaena rockii (H.St.John) Jankalski
 Dracaena rosulata Mwachala & Eb.Fisch.
 Dracaena roxburghiana (Schult. & Schult.f.) Byng & Christenh.
 Dracaena sambiranensis (H.Perrier) Byng & Christenh.
 Dracaena sanderiana Engl. – ribbon dracaena, marketed as "lucky bamboo"
 Dracaena sarawakensis (W.W.Sm.) Jankalski
 Dracaena scabra Bos
 Dracaena scimitariformis (D.J.Richards) Byng & Christenh.
 Dracaena senegambica (Baker) Byng & Christenh.
 Dracaena serpenta Byng & Christenh.
 Dracaena serrulata Baker – Yemen dragon tree
 Dracaena siamica Ridl.
 Dracaena singapurensis Ridl.
 Dracaena singularis (N.E.Br.) Byng & Christenh.
 Dracaena sinus-simiorum (Chahin.) Byng & Christenh.
 Dracaena sordida (N.E.Br.) Byng & Christenh.
 Dracaena spathulata Byng & Christenh.
 Dracaena specksii (Webb & Myklebust) Takaw.-Ny. & Mucina
 Dracaena spicata Roxb.
 Dracaena steudneri Engl.
 Dracaena stuckyi (God.-Leb.) Byng & Christenh.
 Dracaena subspicata (Baker) Byng & Christenh.
 Dracaena subtilis (N.E.Br.) Byng & Christenh.
 Dracaena suffruticosa (N.E.Br.) Byng & Christenh.
 Dracaena surculosa Lindl. – spotted or gold dust dracaena. Formerly D. godseffiana
 Dracaena tamaranae Marrero Rodr., R.S.Almeira & M.Gonzáles-Martin
 Dracaena terniflora Roxb.
 Dracaena testudinea Byng & Christenh.
 Dracaena tholloniana Hua
 Dracaena thwaitesii Regel
 Dracaena timorensis Kunth
 Dracaena trachystachys Hook.f.
 Dracaena transvaalensis Baker
 Dracaena trifasciata (Prain) Mabb.
 Dracaena umbraculifera Jacq.
 Dracaena umbratica Ridl.
 Dracaena usambarensis Engl.
 Dracaena varians (N.E.Br.) Byng & Christenh.
 Dracaena viridiflora Engl. & K.Krause
 Dracaena volkensii (Gürke) Byng & Christenh.
 Dracaena wakaensis Damen & Quiroz
 Dracaena waltersiae Damen
 Dracaena xiphophylla Baker
 Dracaena yuccifolia Ridl.
 Dracaena zebra Byng & Christenh.
 Dracaena zeylanica (L.) Mabb.

Formerly regarded as dracaena

 Asparagus asparagoides (L.) Druce (as D. medeoloides L.f.)
 Cordyline australis (G.Forst.) Endl. (as D. australis G.Forst.)
 Cordyline fruticosa (L.) A.Chev. (as D. terminalis Lam.)
 Cordyline indivisa (G.Forst.) Steud. (as D. indivisa G.Forst.)
 Cordyline obtecta (Graham) Baker (as D. obtecta Graham)
 Cordyline stricta (Sims) Endl. (as D. stricta Sims)
 Dianella ensifolia (L.) DC. (as D. ensifolia L.)
 Liriope graminifolia (L.) Baker (as D. graminifolia L.)
 Lomandra filiformis (Thunb.) Britten (as D. filiformis Thunb.)

Uses

Ornamental
Some shrubby species, such as D. fragrans, D. surculosa, D. marginata, and D. sanderiana, are popular as houseplants. Many of these are toxic to pets, though not humans, according to the ASPCA among others. Rooted stem cuttings of D. sanderiana are sold as "lucky bamboo", although only superficially resembling true bamboos.

Dracaena houseplants like humidity and moderate watering. They can tolerate periods of drought but the tips of the leaves may turn brown. Leaves at the base will naturally yellow and drop off, leaving growth at the top and a bare stem. Dracaena are vulnerable to mealybugs and scale insects.

Other
A naturally occurring bright red resin, dragon's blood, is collected from D. draco and, in ancient times, from D. cinnabari. Modern dragon's blood is however more likely to be from the unrelated Daemonorops rattan palms. It also has social functions in marking graves, sacred sites and farm plots in many African societies

References

Notes

Citations

Sources

Further reading

External links

 Socotra botany . Royal Botanic Garden, Edinburgh.

 
Asparagaceae genera